The Pearson 28-2 is an American sailboat, that was designed by William Shaw and first built in 1985.

The Pearson 28-2 was a new design and replaced the Pearson 28 in the company product line.

Production
The boat was built by Pearson Yachts in the United States from 1985 to 1989, but it is now out of production.

Design

The Pearson 28-2 is a recreational keelboat, built predominantly of fiberglass, it has a balsa cored deck and wood trim. The design has a masthead sloop rig, an internally-mounted spade-type rudder and a fixed fin keel.

The boat is fitted with a Japanese Yanmar 2GM20 diesel engine.

The boat has a PHRF racing average handicap of 186 with a high of 192 and low of 180.

See also
List of sailing boat types

Related development
Pearson 28

Similar sailboats
Aloha 28
Beneteau First 285
Beneteau Oceanis 281
Cal 28
Catalina 28
Cumulus 28
Grampian 28
Hunter 28
Hunter 28.5
Hunter 280
O'Day 28
Sabre 28
Sea Sprite 27
Sirius 28
Tanzer 8.5
Tanzer 28
TES 28 Magnam
Viking 28

References

External links

Keelboats
1980s sailboat type designs
Sailing yachts
Sailboat type designs by William Shaw
Sailboat types built by Pearson Yachts